Charles Fox (1794–1849) was an English engraver.

Life
Fox was born at Cossey, near Norwich, where his father was steward to Lord Stafford, of Cossey Hall. After a period of studying engraving under Edwards at Bungay, he came up to London, became an inmate in the studio of John Burnet, who was at that time engaged in engraving some of Wilkie's principal works, and assisted Burnet in their completion.

When John Lindley, his fellow-townsman, was appointed secretary of the Horticultural Society, Fox was chosen as a judge and arbitrator for its prizes. He also executed all the engravings for a periodical called The Florist.  He died at Leyton in 1849,

Works
Fox engraved plates after Wilkie for Robert Cadell's edition of Sir Walter Scott's novels, and various illustrations to the Annuals of the day. His large engravings are a whole-length portrait of Sir George Murray, after Pickersgill; The First Council of the Queen and Village Recruits, after Wilkie. At the time of his death he was engaged upon a large print after William Mulready's picture of The Fight interrupted.

External Link
 , an engraving of a painting by Henry William Pickersgill for The Amulet annual for 1832, with a poetical illustration by Letitia Elizabeth Landon.
 , an engraving of A Sailing Match, a painting by William Mulready, for The Amulet annual for 1833, with a poetical illustration by Letitia Elizabeth Landon.
 , an engraving of a painting by H W Pickles for Fisher's Drawing Room Scrap Book, 1838 with a poetical illustration by Letitia Elizabeth Landon.

References
 

1794 births
1849 deaths
People from Costessey
English engravers